The Bell of Good Luck is a large bell located in Foquan Temple in Pingdingshan, Henan, China. It is close to the Spring Temple Buddha, the world's tallest Buddha statue. The bell weighs 116 metric tons (255,736 lbs.), and is 8.108 metres in height and 5.118 metres in diameter at its widest point. The Bell of Good Luck therefore, at the time of its construction, claimed the title of heaviest functioning bell in the world.

The bell was cast in December 2000 and first rung at midnight on New Year's Eve the same month. The bell's shoulder section is adorned with 36 lotus petal patterns.

See also
List of heaviest bells

References

External links 
Video of the bell 

Individual bells
Buildings and structures in Henan
Buildings and structures completed in 2000